Katang or Kataang may be,
the Katang dialect of the Ta’Oi language,
an alternative spelling of Kattang, or Gathang language,
or one of the other languages spoken by the Katang people, 
Northern Katang language
Southern Katang language